The following is a list of notable deaths in April 2013.

Entries for each day are listed alphabetically by surname. A typical entry lists information in the following sequence:
Name, age, country of citizenship and reason for notability, established cause of death, reference.

April 2013

1
Badr bin Abdulaziz Al Saud, 81, Saudi royal.
Marjorie Anthony Linden, 77, Canadian television producer and media executive.
Asal Badiee, 35, Iranian actress, complications from a drug overdose.
Moses Blah, 65, Liberian politician, President (2003).
David Burge, 83, American pianist, complications from a heart attack.
Chen Zhaodi, 57, Chinese volleyball player (national women's team) and general, cancer.
Kildare Dobbs, 89, Indian-born Canadian short-story and travel writer, multiple organ failure.
John Don, 94, Australian politician, member of the Victorian Legislative Assembly for Elsternwick.
Peter Drewett, 64, English archaeologist.
Norm Gigon, 74, American baseball player (Chicago Cubs).
William H. Ginsburg, 70, American lawyer (Lewinsky scandal), cancer.
Eskild Jensen, 87, Norwegian politician.
Barbara Piasecka Johnson, 76, Polish-born American art collector and philanthropist.
Nicolae Martinescu, 73, Romanian Olympic champion wrestler (1972).
Anthony Montague Browne, 89, British diplomat.
Karen Muir, 60, South African swimmer (youngest sporting world record holder) and physician, breast cancer.
Jack Pardee, 76, American football player (Los Angeles Rams) and coach (Houston Oilers, Chicago Bears, Washington Redskins), complications from gall bladder cancer.
Pavel 183, 29, Russian street artist. 
Bob Smith, 82, American baseball player (Boston Red Sox).
Alexej Stachowitsch, 94, Austrian-Russian author, pedagogue and songwriter.
Greg Willard, 54, American basketball referee, pancreatic cancer.

2
Maysara Abu Hamdiya, 64, Palestinian general, cancer.
Chuck Fairbanks, 79, American football coach (New England Patriots, University of Oklahoma), brain cancer.
Jesús Franco, 82, Spanish film director and screenwriter (Count Dracula), complications from a stroke.
Fred, 82, French cartoonist.
Kurt Hellmann, 90, British pharmacologist.
Jane Henson, 78, American puppeteer, co-founder of The Muppets, cancer.
Ted James, 88, English cricket player (Sussex).
Ibrahim Zeid Keilani, 76, Jordanian politician, Minister of Awqaf and Islamic Affairs; Member of the House of Representatives (1993–1997).
Adrian Leftwich, 72–73, South African political activist, lung cancer.
Jim T. Lindsey, 87, American politician, member of the Texas House of Representatives (1949–1957); Speaker (1955–1957).
Johnny Lunde, 89, Norwegian Olympic alpine skier.
Duke Kimbrough McCall, 98, American Christian activist and leader.
Barry Mealand, 70, English footballer (Fulham).
Milo O'Shea, 86, Irish actor (Mass Appeal, Ulysses, Theatre of Blood).
Mariano Pulido, 56, Spanish footballer and manager (Sevilla FC), degenerative disease.
Benjamin Purcell, 85, American military officer and politician, highest ranking POW during the Vietnam War, member of Georgia House (19931997), natural causes.
Willem P.C. Stemmer, 56, Dutch scientist, cancer.
Twilight Ridge, 30, American Thoroughbred racing filly.
Linda Vogt, 90, Australian flautist.
Othniel Wienges, 88, American politician and horse breeder, member of the South Carolina House of Representatives (19621972).
Ian Wilson, 80, Australian politician, Minister for Home Affairs and the Environment (1981–1982) and Aboriginal Affairs (1982–1983); MP for Sturt (1966–1969; 1972–1993).

3
Mariví Bilbao, 83, Spanish actress (La que se avecina, Aquí no hay quien viva), natural causes.
Fergy Brown, 90, Scottish-born Canadian politician, Mayor of York (19881994).
Ralph Brown, 85, British sculptor.
Kiki Byrne, 75, Norwegian-born British fashion designer.
Basil Copper, 89, British writer, complications from Alzheimer's disease.
Cornelius the First,  black rhinoceros, Canadian politician, pneumonia.
Georges Corvington, 86, Haitian historian, heart failure.
Guy Cotten, 76, French businessman.
Eugene Crum, 59, American sheriff (Mingo County, West Virginia), shot.
Gloria de Souza, 75, Indian educator.
Robert Elgie, 84, Canadian politician, MPP for York East (19771985), heart failure.
Douglas Freeman, 96, English cricketer. 
George Gladir, 87, American comic book writer (Archie, Sabrina the Teenage Witch).
Mazharul Haque, 32, Bangladeshi cricketer, heart attack.
Harry J, 67, Jamaican music producer, studio owner and musician, diabetes.
Stan Isaacs, 83, American sports columnist. 
Ruth Prawer Jhabvala, 85, German-born British-American novelist and screenwriter (A Room with a View, Howards End), Booker Prize winner (1975), pulmonary failure.
Juanito, 64, Spanish footballer (UD Salamanca).
Graham Lea, 79, Canadian broadcaster and politician, British Columbia MLA for Prince Rupert (19721984).
Farouk Abdel Wahab Mustafa, 70, Egyptian translator.
Herman van Raalte, 91, Dutch international footballer.
Jan Remmers, 90, Dutch football coach.
Jean Sincere, 93, American actress (Glee, Roxanne, The Incredibles).
Dorothy Taubman, 95, American music teacher.
Robert Ward, 95, American composer (The Crucible), Pulitzer Prize winner (1962).

4
Rehavam Amir, 97, Israeli diplomat.
Chris Bailey, 62, Australian bass guitarist and vocalist, throat cancer.
Harry Birkhead, South African philatelist.
Dale Bisnauth, 76, Guyanese politician and academic, heart attack.
Bengt Blomgren, 89, Swedish actor and director, prostate cancer.
Brian's Time, 28, American Thoroughbred racehorse, euthanized.
Víctor Carranza, 77, Colombian emerald businessman, lung and prostate cancer.
Roger Ebert, 70, American film critic (Chicago Sun-Times, Siskel & Ebert), Pulitzer Prize winner (1975), thyroid cancer.
Carmine Infantino, 87, American comic book artist (Batman, Green Lantern, Human Target) and editor.
Besedka Johnson, 87, American actress (Starlet).
Osmo Karjalainen, 73, Finnish Olympic skier.
Stephen Macknowski, 91, American sprint canoeist.
Beatrice Palner, 75, Danish actress.
Joseph Pease, 3rd Baron Gainford, 91, British aristocrat.
Apidej Sit-Hirun, 72, Thai martial artist (Muay Thai), lung cancer.
Cory L. Richards, 64, American reproductive health activist, pancreatic cancer.
Eldred G. Smith, 106, American patriarch emeritus of the Church of Jesus Christ of Latter-day Saints.
Tommy Tycho, 84, Hungarian-born Australian composer, arranger and orchestra conductor, complications following a stroke.
Ian Walsh, 80, Australian rugby league player, captain of St. George Dragons and national team.
Noboru Yamaguchi, 41, Japanese author (The Familiar of Zero), cancer.

5
Curt Berklund, 83, American administrator.
Regina Bianchi, 92, Italian stage and film actress (The Four Days of Naples), natural causes.
Amnon Dankner, 67, Israeli newspaper editor (Maariv) and journalist, heart attack.
Piero de Palma, 87, Italian opera singer.
James Dickens, 82, British politician MP for Lewisham West (1966–1970).
Albert J. Engel Jr., 89, American judge, member of US Court of Appeals for the Sixth Circuit (since 1973).
David Hunt, 87, American Christian apologist and author, natural causes.
Mohammad Ishaq Khan, 67, Indian historian, heart failure.
David Kuo, 44, American author and civil servant, brain cancer.
I.R.A. MacCallum, 82, British solicitor and politician in Hong Kong.
Peter Maxwell, 92, Austrian-born British film and television director (A Country Practice).
Nikolaos Pappas, 83, Greek Navy officer, leader of the 1973 mutiny against the military junta, cancer.
Bill Stephen, 91, Australian politician, member of the Victorian Legislative Assembly for Ballarat South (1964–1979).

6
George Anania, 71, Romanian science-fiction writer and translator.
Dame Hilda Bynoe, 91, Grenadian politician, Governor (1968–1974).
Mizanur Rahman Chowdhury (Jamaat-e-Islami politician), Bangladeshi politician.
Veljko Despotović, 81, Serbian production designer.
Cid Edwards, 69, American football player.
Johnny Esaw, 87, Canadian sports broadcaster, pulmonary failure.
Matt Gilsenan, 97, Irish Gaelic football player.
Bill Guttridge, 82, English footballer (Walsall F.C.), Parkinson's disease and pneumonia.
Bigas Luna, 67, Spanish film director (Anguish, Yo soy la Juani), leukemia.
Michael Norgrove, 31, Zambian-born British boxer, cerebral bleeding.
Funmilayo Olayinka, 52, Nigerian politician, cancer.
Miguel Poblet, 85, Spanish racing cyclist, kidney failure. 
Alan Protheroe, 79, British television executive.
Ottmar Schreiner, 67, German politician, MP for Saarlouis (since 1980), cancer.
Don Shirley, 86, American pianist.
Anne Smedinghoff, 25, American diplomat, bombing.
Herbert Werner, 92, German Navy U-boat officer. 
Celso Yegros Estigarribia, 77, Paraguayan Roman Catholic prelate, Bishop of Carapeguá (19832010), complications of Parkinson's disease.

7
Marty Blake, 86, American basketball executive, GM of Atlanta Hawks (19541970), NBA Director of Scouting (19762011).
Les Blank, 77, American documentary filmmaker (Werner Herzog Eats His Shoe, Burden of Dreams), bladder cancer.
Vernal Charles, 27, South African cricketer, traffic collision.
Gan Eng Teck, 79, Singaporean Olympic water polo player.
Richard Grand, 83, American lawyer, natural causes.
Michel Hénon, 82, French mathematician and astronomer.
Hans Jäcker, 80, German footballer (Eintracht Braunschweig).
Andy Johns, 62, British record producer (Led Zeppelin, The Rolling Stones), bleeding from stomach ulcer.
Wann Langston, Jr., 91, American paleontologist.
Ijaz Mirza, 71, Pakistani cricketer.
Sir Kenneth Murray, 82, British biologist.
Lilly Pulitzer, 81, American fashion designer.
Mickey Rose, 77, American film and television screenwriter (Bananas, All in the Family, The Odd Couple), colon cancer.
Betty Rusynyk, 88, American baseball player.
Yusuf Warsame Saeed, Somali politician. 
John St Aubyn, 4th Baron St Levan, 94, British aristocrat and naval officer.
Carl Williams, 53, American boxer, esophageal cancer.

8
Abdul Hadi Al-Fadhli, 78, Iraqi writer and academic.
Mikhail Beketov, 55, Russian journalist and activist, heart failure.
Leslie Broderick, 91, British military officer, one of the last three survivors of "The Great Escape".
Richard Brooker, 58, British actor and stuntman (Friday the 13th Part III, Deathstalker), heart attack. 
Gene Campbell, 80, American Olympic ice hockey player (1956).
Alain de Weck, 84, Swiss immunologist.
Waldemar Esteves da Cunha, 92, Brazilian carnival king, respiratory failure and Alzheimer's disease.
Annette Funicello, 70, American actress (The Mickey Mouse Club) and singer ("Tall Paul"), complications from multiple sclerosis.
Katharine Giles, 35, British climate scientist, cycling accident.
Patrick Kankiriho, 52, Ugandan military officer.
Greg Kramer, 51, British-born Canadian actor (300, On the Road, Arthur) and author.
François-Wolff Ligondé, 85, Haitian Roman Catholic prelate, Archbishop of Port-au-Prince (19662008), complications of heart disease and diabetes.
Sara Montiel, 85, Spanish actress and singer, cardiac arrest.
*Anne Fitzalan-Howard, Duchess of Norfolk, 85, British peeress and charity worker.
Tommy Molloy, 79, British boxer, heart attack.
Pepe Ozan, 73, Argentine sculptor and artistic director. 
Frank Panton, 89, British military scientist.
Peter Reveen, 77, Australian-born American stage hypnotist and illusionist, complications of diabetes and dementia.
William Royer, 92, American politician, member of the U.S. House of Representatives from California (1979–1981).
José Luis Sampedro, 96, Spanish writer and economist, natural causes.
Franco Biondi Santi, 91, Italian winemaker.
J. F. A. Soza, 94, Sri Lankan judge, member of the Supreme Court.
Margaret Thatcher, Baroness Thatcher, 87, British stateswoman, prime minister (1979–1990), MP (1959–1992) and member of the House of Lords (since 1992), stroke.
Marian Robertson Wilson, 86, American musician.
Yasuhiro Yamada, 45, Japanese footballer, liver cancer.

9
Desmond Hamill, 76, British television news reporter.
David Hayes, 82, American sculptor, leukemia.
Lynn Lundquist, 78, American politician, member (19941998) and Speaker of the Oregon House of Representatives (19971998).
Jim McAllister, 68, Northern Irish politician, cancer.
Greg McCrary, 61, American football player (Atlanta Falcons, San Diego Chargers, Washington Redskins), cardiac arrest.
Mordechai Mishani, 67, Israeli politician, Member of Knesset (2001–2003).
*Luis Antonio Nova Rocha, 69, Colombian Roman Catholic prelate, Auxiliary Bishop of Barranquilla (20022010), Bishop of Facatativá (since 2010), heart attack.
Ronald Osborne, 66, British-born Canadian businessman, Chairman of Postmedia Network (since 2010), Sun Life Financial (20052010), CEO of Maclean-Hunter (19861994).
Emilio Pericoli, 85, Italian singer.
McCandlish Phillips, 85, American journalist (The New York Times).
Paolo Soleri, 93, Italian architect, natural causes.
*Zao Wou-Ki, 93, Chinese-born French artist.

10
Lorenzo Antonetti, 90, Italian Roman Catholic prelate, Cardinal of Sant'Agnese in Agone (since 1998), Apostolic Nuncio to France (1988–1995).
Binod Bihari Chowdhury, 102, Bangladeshi activist for Indian independence.
Raymond Boudon, 79, French academic.
Jimmy Dawkins, 76, American blues musician.
Sir Robert Edwards, 87, British physiologist, Nobel Prize laureate (2010). 
Alexandru Fronea, 79, Romanian footballer.
Akhsarbek Galazov, 83, Russian scientist and politician, President of North Ossetia–Alania (1994–1998).
Dick Hart, 77, American golfer. 
George Hunter, 92, Canadian documentary photographer.
Jan Jaworowski, 85, Polish and American mathematician.
Aleksandar Kozlina, 74, Yugoslav footballer.
Olive Lewin, 85, Jamaican social anthropologist and musicologist.
Robert Hugh McWilliams, Jr., 96, American judge, US Court of Appeals – Tenth Circuit (1970–1984), Colorado Supreme Court (1961–1970).
Bernhard Rieger, 90, German Roman Catholic prelate, Auxiliary Bishop of Rottenburg-Stuttgart (1985–1996).
Enrique Ros, 89, Cuban historian and activist, respiratory complications.
Gordon Thomas, 91, British Olympic silver-medal cyclist (1948), winner of the Tour of Britain (1953).
Lafe Ward, 87, American politician, member of the West Virginia Senate (1971–1983).
Don Williams, 70, American poker player.
Andrei Zelevinsky, 60, Russian mathematician.

11
Don Blackman, 59, American jazz-funk pianist, singer and songwriter, cancer.
Edward de Grazia, 86, American lawyer and writer (Girls Lean Back Everywhere).
Sue Draheim, 63, American fiddler, cancer. 
Edward A. Frieman, 87, American physicist and national policy advisor, respiratory illness.
Adam Galos, 88, Polish historian.
Sidney Goodman, 77, American figurative painter and draftsman.
Grady Hatton, 90, American baseball player (Cincinnati Reds) and manager (Houston Astros), natural causes.
Thomas Hemsley, 85, English opera singer.
Igor, 30, walrus, euthanized.
Fakhrul Islam, 46, Pakistani politician, shot.
Shorty Jenkins, 77, Canadian curling icemaker.
Ram Karmi, 82, Israeli architect, winner of the Israel Prize (2002).
Hilary Koprowski, 96, Polish-born American virologist and immunologist, invented first effective live polio vaccine, pneumonia.
César Madelón, 85, Argentine Olympic equestrian.
Zachariah Alpheus Mahlomola Molotsi, 60, South African politician.
Stephen Mallinga, 69, Ugandan politician and physician.
Errol Mann, 71, American football player (Oakland Raiders, Detroit Lions), heart attack.
Gilles Marchal, 68, French songwriter and singer.
Michael Gough Matthews, 81, British pianist, teacher and musical administrator.
Bernard McGlinchey, 80, Irish businessman and politician, Senator (19611981).
David O'Halloran, 57, Australian football player (Hawthorn), heart attack.
Maudelle Shirek, 101, American politician, Vice Mayor of Berkeley, California.
Maria Tallchief, 88, American prima ballerina.
Clorindo Testa, 89, Italian-born Argentine architect and artist.
Fausto Valdiviezo, 52, Ecuadorian journalist, reporter and television presenter, shot.
Angela Voigt, 61, East German Olympic champion long jumper (1976).
Jonathan Winters, 87, American comedian and actor (It's a Mad, Mad, Mad, Mad World, Mork & Mindy, The Smurfs), Emmy winner (1991).

12
Sir John Burgh, 87, Austrian-born British civil servant, Director-General of the British Council (1980–1987).
Robert Byrne, 84, American chess grandmaster and columnist (The New York Times), Parkinson's disease.
Roger Dobson, 58, British writer.
Johnny du Plooy, 48, South African heavyweight boxer, heart failure.
Michael France, 51, American screenwriter (GoldenEye, The Punisher, Hulk), complications from diabetes.
Marv Harshman, 95, American basketball coach (University of Washington, Washington State University), Member of the Naismith Memorial Basketball Hall of Fame.
Erwin Hymer, 82, German businessman, founder of Hymer.
Dennis John, 78, Welsh footballer.
Fred Lovegrove, 73, American politician, member of the Connecticut Senate (1982–1998).
Brennan Manning, 78, American priest and author.
Terry McCabe, 67, American golf club designer.
Oöphoi, 55, Italian ambient musician.
Stefan Stoykov, 75, Bulgarian Olympic basketball player.
Annamária Szalai, 51, Hungarian politician and journalist, MP for Zala County (1998–2004), President of National Media and Infocommunications Authority (since 2010).
Frosty Westering, 85, American football coach, member of the College Football Hall of Fame, coached four national champions.
Ya'akov Yosef, 66, Israeli rabbi and politician, cancer.

13
Frank Bank, 71, American actor (Leave It to Beaver), cancer.
Chi Cheng, 42, American bassist (Deftones), cardiac arrest.
Stephen Dodgson, 89, British composer.
Dean Drummond, 64, American composer, musician (Newband) and instrument inventor, multiple myeloma.
Ian Henderson, 86, British colonial police officer.
Adolph Herseth, 91, American trumpet player (Chicago Symphony Orchestra).
Abdelhamid Kermali, 81, Algerian football player and coach.
Lin Yang-kang, 85, Taiwanese politician, Mayor of Taipei (1976–1978), Governor of Taiwan Province (1978–1981), President of Judicial Yuan (1987–1994), multiple organ failure.
Vincent Montana Jr., 85, American composer, arranger, and percussionist (MFSB, Salsoul Orchestra). 
Hilmar Myhra, 97, Norwegian ski jumper. 
Henk Peeters, 87, Dutch artist.
Bob J. Perry, 80, American real estate magnate.
Nick Pollotta, 57, American science fiction author, cancer.
Edwin G. Pulleyblank, 90, Canadian sinologist and linguist.
William Steck, 79, American violinist (National Symphony Orchestra), respiratory failure.
Jadene Felina Stevens, 65–66, American poet, cancer.
Don Syme, 91, Australian local politician and communist activist.
Levi Ying, 64, Taiwanese-American politician, MLY (1999–2002).

14
Efi Arazi, 76, Israeli businessman.
Ian Balfour, 2nd Baron Balfour of Inchrye, 88, British hereditary peer.
Donald Burkholder, 86, American mathematician.
Sir Colin Davis, 85, British conductor, President of the London Symphony Orchestra.
*Jaime Enrique Duque Correa, 70, Colombian Roman Catholic prelate, Bishop of El Banco (since 2006).
R. P. Goenka, 83, Indian businessman, founder of the RPG Group, cancer.
A. S. A. Harrison, 65, Canadian writer and artist, cancer.
Tom Huff, 80, American politician, member of the Washington House of Representatives (19952000), pulmonary fibrosis.
Stanislav Hurenko, 76, Ukrainian Soviet politician, last First Secretary of the Communist Party of the Ukrainian SSR (19901991), cancer.
George Jackson, 68, American singer-songwriter ("Old Time Rock and Roll", "One Bad Apple"), cancer.
Rentarō Mikuni, 90, Japanese actor (Rikyu) and director, cardiac failure.
Dennis Moran, 30, American computer criminal, heroin overdose.
H. Burke Peterson, 89, American Member of the Presiding Bishopric of the Church of Jesus Christ of Latter-day Saints.
John S. Ragin, 83, American actor (Quincy, M.E., The Parallax View, Earthquake).
Makame Rashidi, 69, Tanzanian military officer and diplomat, Ambassador to Malawi, leader of Tanzania People's Defence Force (19892001).
Mike Road, 95, American actor (Jonny Quest, Space Ghost).
P. B. Sreenivas, 82, Indian singer, heart attack.
Seth Taft, 90, American politician.
Stanko Topolčnik, 65, Slovenian Olympic judoka.
Alberto Valdés, 94, Mexican Olympic champion equestrian (1948).
Armando Villanueva, 97, Peruvian politician, Prime Minister (19881989).
Christine White, 86, American actress (Magnum Force, Perry Mason, The Twilight Zone).
Charlie Wilson, 70, American politician, member of the US House (20072011), Ohio House (19972005) and Ohio Senate (20052007), complications of a stroke.

15
Sal Castro, 79, American community activist and teacher, thyroid cancer.
Benny Frankie Cerezo, 70, Puerto Rican politician.
Richard Collins, 65, Canadian actor (Trailer Park Boys), heart attack.
Danny Dahill, 93, American politician, member of the West Virginia House of Delegates (19571960), West Virginia Senate (19611964).
Muhammad Fazal Karim, 58, Pakistani politician, liver failure.
Benjamin Fain, 83, Ukrainian-born Israeli physicist and refusenik.
Joe Francis, 76, American football player (Green Bay Packers, Montreal Alouettes).
Richard LeParmentier, 66, American actor (Star Wars, Who Framed Roger Rabbit, Octopussy).
Dave McArtney, 62, New Zealand musician (Hello Sailor), cancer.
Scott Miller, 53, American singer-songwriter and musician (Game Theory, Loud Family), suicide.
Jean-François Paillard, 85, French classical conductor.
Robert Perloff, 92, American psychologist and academic.
Zastrow Simms, 78, American civil rights activist. 
Cleyde Yáconis, 89, Brazilian film, stage and television actress, ischemia.

16
Horst Bittner, 85, East German politician.
Charles Bruzon, 74, British Gibraltarian politician, MP (since 2003).
Halka Chronic, 90, American geologist.
William D. Curry, 87, United States Air Force officer.
Jack Daniels, 85, American baseball player (Boston Braves).
*George Horse Capture, 75, American Gros Ventre author, archivist and curator (Plains Indian Museum, National Museum of the American Indian), kidney failure.
Frances K. Graham, 94–95, American psychologist.
Gérard Jaquet, 97, French politician.
Ali Kafi, 84, Algerian politician, Chairman of the High Council of State (1992–1994).
Bob Kahler, 96, American football player (Green Bay Packers) and coach (Northern Illinois Huskies).
Helmut Kasimier, 86, German politician, Finance Minister of Lower Saxony (19741976).
Lloyd Koch, 81, South African cricketer.
Francis Leo Lawrence, 75, American educator and French literature scholar, President of Rutgers University (1990–2002).
Reinhard Lettmann, 80, German Roman Catholic prelate, Bishop of Münster (19802008).
Siegfried Ludwig, 87, Austrian politician, Governor of Lower Austria (19811992).
Pentti Lund, 87, Finnish-born Canadian ice hockey player (New York Rangers, Boston Bruins).
Rita MacNeil, 68, Canadian Juno Award-winning singer and variety show host, complications from surgery.
Gumersindo Magaña, 75, Mexican politician.
Srifa Mahawan, 83, Thai writer.
Ernle Money, 82, English politician, MP for Ipswich (1970–1974).
Martinus Petrus Maria Muskens, 77, Dutch Roman Catholic prelate, Bishop of Breda (19942007).
Robert W. Olson, 92, American Seventh-day Adventist leader, director of the Ellen G. White Estate (1978–1990).
Joseph F. Rychlak, 84, American psychologist.
Klaus Schulze, 85, German rower.
George Beverly Shea, 104, Canadian-born American gospel music singer, complications from a stroke.
Edwin Shirley, 64, English rock tour organiser and film studio manager, cancer. 
Pat Summerall, 82, American football player (New York Giants) and broadcaster (NFL on CBS, NFL on FOX), cardiac arrest.
Pedro Ramírez Vázquez, 94, Mexican architect, pneumonia.
Murray Vernon, 76, Australian cricketer (Western Australia).
Bob Yates, 74, American football player.

17
K.P. Bhaskar, 88, Indian classical dance pioneer, heart ailment.
Sita Chan, 26, Hong Kong pop singer, traffic collision.
Paul Dan Cristea, 72, Romanian professor of engineering.
Deanna Durbin, 91, Canadian singer and actress (Three Smart Girls).
Gerino Gerini, 84, Italian racing driver.
Bernard Gilmore, 75, American composer, conductor and academic, Alzheimer's disease.
Carlos Graça, 82, São Toméan politician, Prime Minister (1994–1995).
Tony Harper, 74, Bermudian Olympic sprinter.
Kauko Kangasniemi, 70, Finnish Olympic weightlifter and world record holder.
Bi Kidude, c. 100, Tanzanian Zanzibari Taarab singer.
Gerald W. Lynch, 76, American academic, President of John Jay College of Criminal Justice (1976–2004).
Peter Mackay, 86, British journalist and political activist in Zimbabwe, Malawi and Tanzania.
John Maitland Moir, 88, Scottish priest.
Emilio Massino, 87,  Italian sailor (sport).
Albert Messiah, 91, French physicist.
Yngve Moe, 55, Norwegian bass guitarist (Dance with a Stranger), drowning.
V. S. Ramadevi, 79, Indian politician, Governor of Karnataka (19992002), Governor of Himachal Pradesh (19971999), cardiac arrest.
T. K. Ramamoorthy, 91, Indian composer and violinist.
Dariush Safvat, 85, Iranian musician, natural causes.
Paul Ware, 42, English footballer, brain tumour.
Stan Vickers, 80, British Olympic bronze medallist long-distance walker (1960).
Ella Waldek, 83, American professional wrestler. 
Wubong, 62, Polish Zen master.
Viktor Zhivov, 68, Russian philologist.

18
Serkan Acar, 64, Turkish football player (Fenerbahçe).
Donald Chapman, Baron Northfield, 89, British politician, MP for Birmingham Northfield (1951–1970).
Peter Michael Chenaparampil, 83, Indian Roman Catholic prelate, Bishop of Alleppey (1984–2001).
Estella B. Diggs, 96, American politician, member of the New York State Assembly (1972–1980).
Ilona Edelsheim-Gyulai, 95, Hungarian noblewoman.
Mikiel Fsadni, 97, Maltese friar and historian.
Leopold Gernhardt, 93, Austrian footballer (SK Rapid Wien).
Dorothy Gordon, 89, British actress.
Aisea Katonivere, Fijian politician and chief.
Augustine Lopez, 78, American politician, Chairman of the Tohono O'odham Nation (1971–1973).
Cordell Mosson, 60, American bassist (Parliament-Funkadelic), liver failure.
Robert W. Peterson, 84, American politician, member of the North Dakota House of Representatives (1967–1972), North Dakota State Auditor (1973–1996).
Jack Price, 94, English footballer (Hartlepool United).
Sir Steuart Pringle, 84, British Royal Marines lieutenant general.
Lex Redelé, 74, Dutch Olympic rower.
Vytautas Šapranauskas, 54, Lithuanian actor, suicide.
Elisabeth Scherer, 98, German actress.
Goran Švob, 65, Croatian philosopher and author. 
Storm Thorgerson, 69, British graphic designer and album cover artist (Pink Floyd, Led Zeppelin, Muse), cancer.
Hans-Joachim Walde, 70, German Olympic medal-winning (1964, 1968) decathlete.
Anne Williams, 62, British activist (Hillsborough disaster), bowel cancer.
Alan Wood, 90, American Navy officer, supplied the American flag for the Raising the Flag on Iwo Jima photograph, heart failure.
Gráinne Yeats, 88, Irish harpist and singer.
Maire Österdahl, 86, Finnish Olympic sprinter.

19
Aharon ben Ab-Chisda ben Yaacob, 86, Palestinian religious leader, Samaritan High Priest.
Sivanthi Adithan, 76, Indian newspaper owner (Dina Thanthi).
Kenneth Appel, 80, American mathematician, solved the four color theorem, esophageal cancer.
Allan Arbus, 95, American actor (M*A*S*H, Coffy, Putney Swope), heart failure.
Peter Armit, 87, Scottish footballer (St Johnstone, Hamilton Academical).
Clive Best, 82, British rugby league player (Barrow).
Leo Branton Jr., 91, American lawyer.
Mike Denness, 72, Scottish cricketer, captain of Kent (1972–1976) and England (1974–1975), cancer.
Lynne Duke, 56, American journalist (The Washington Post) and author, lung cancer.
Patrick Garland, 78, English theatre director, actor and writer, cancer.
Aishah Ghani, 90, Malaysian politician, natural causes.
Alicia Gladden, 27, American basketball player, traffic collision.
Kurt Hector, 41, Dominican international football manager, traffic collision.
Robert Holding, 86, American billionaire businessman (Sinclair Oil, Grand America Hotels & Resorts).
François Jacob, 92, French biologist, Nobel Prize (1965).
Saleh Jerbo, 36, Sudanese rebel leader and alleged war criminal, military action.
Thomas Joseph Kelly, 93, American horse trainer (Plugged Nickle), member of National Museum of Racing and Hall of Fame (1993).
Bill Knott, 92, Australian politician, member of the New South Wales Legislative Assembly (1978–1986).
E. L. Konigsburg, 83, American children's novelist and illustrator (From the Mixed-Up Files of Mrs. Basil E. Frankweiler), Newbery Medal (1968, 1997), stroke complications.
C. Kuppusami, 86, Indian politician, MP for Chennai North (1998–2009).
Palle Lykke, 76, Danish Olympic racing cyclist.
Cortright McMeel, 41, American novelist.
Al Neuharth, 89, American newspaper businessman, columnist and author, founder of USA Today, complications of injuries from a fall.
Maurice Quentin, 92, French racing cyclist.
Tamerlan Tsarnaev, 26, Russian suspect in the Boston Marathon bombings, shot and blunt force trauma.
Hilda Walterová, 98, Czech Olympic alpine skier.
John Willson, 81, British diplomat.

20
Eleanor R. Adair, 86, American scientist.
Hassan Alavikia, 102, Iranian spy chief.
Günseli Başar, 81, Turkish beauty pageant winner, Miss Europe (1952).
Victoria Blyth Hill, 67, American art conservator.
Glenn Cannon, 80, American actor (Hawaii Five-O, Magnum P.I., Combat!). 
Amin Ahmed Chowdhury, 67, Bangladeshi army officer and diplomat, heart attack.
Peter Kane Dufault, 89, American poet.
Peter Garrisson, 90, Australian politician, member of the Victorian Legislative Assembly for Hawthorn (1958–1964).
Quinton Hoover, 49, American artist and trading card illustrator (Magic: The Gathering).
*Huang Wenyong, 60, Malaysian-born Singaporean actor, lymphoma.
Jocasta Innes, 78, British non-fiction writer and businesswoman.
Rick Mather, 75, American architect.
Luis Molina, 74, American Olympic boxer (1956).
Howard Phillips, 72, American politician, founder of the Constitution Party, dementia and Alzheimer's disease.
Nosher Powell, 84, British actor, stuntman (Willow, First Knight) and boxer.
Toby E. Rodes, 93, German businessman.
Syed Zahiruddin, 95, Malaysian politician, Yang di-Pertua Negeri of Malacca (19751984), Ambassador to Ireland (1975) and the United Kingdom (1974), kidney failure.

21
Gerard Amerongen, 98, Canadian politician and lawyer, Speaker of the Legislative Assembly of Alberta (1972–1986), MLA for Edmonton-Meadowlark (1971–1986).
Chrissy Amphlett, 53, Australian singer (Divinyls), breast cancer and multiple sclerosis.
Ludvig Johan Bakkevig, 91, Norwegian civil engineer and church leader.
Barbara Barbaze, 90, Canadian baseball player (AAGPBL).
Norman Borisoff, 94, American film producer and novelist. 
Ambati Brahmanaiah, 75, Indian politician, MP for Machilipatnam (1994–2004), MLA for Machilipatnam (1994–2004) and Avanigadda (since 2009), leader of the TDP.
George Bunn, 87, American diplomat and jurist, led negotiation of the Treaty of Non-Proliferation of Nuclear Weapons.
Morley Byron Bursey, 101, Canadian diplomat.
Captain Steve, 16, American thoroughbred horse, winner of Dubai World Cup (2001), heart failure.
Jean-Michel Damase, 85, French composer, pianist, and teacher.
Shakuntala Devi, 83, Indian prodigy mental calculator, heart attack.
Leopold Engleitner, 107, Austrian concentration camp survivor.
James Fitzgerald, 67, English cricketer.
Gordon D. Gayle, 95, American Marine Corps brigadier general and historian.
Krishana Kumar Goyal, 80, Indian politician.
Sigurd Helle, 92, Norwegian topographer.
Richard Iton, 51, Canadian academic and writer, leukemia.
Geraldo José da Silva, 77, Brazilian footballer.
Layton Kor, 74, American climber, kidney failure and prostate cancer.
Kriyananda, 86, American yogi and spiritual leader.
Jimmy McGill, 87, Scottish footballer (Queen of the South), dementia.
William Edward Murray, 93, Australian Roman Catholic prelate, Bishop of Wollongong (1975–1996).
Toshio Narahashi, 86, Japanese pharmacologist.
Bjarne Sandemose, 89, Norwegian inventor and film prop maker.

22
Pedro Apellániz, 89, Spanish Olympic athlete.
Struther Arnott, 78, Scottish biochemist and academic, Principal of St Andrews University (19861999).
Vivi Bach, 73, Danish actress, heart failure.
Doug Carlson, 73, American politician, member of the Minnesota House of Representatives (19711974, 19771990), natural causes.
Dave Gold, 80, American retail businessman, founder of 99 Cents Only Stores, heart attack.
George Stanley Gordon, 86, American advertising executive.
Richie Havens, 72, American folk singer and guitarist, heart attack.
Lalgudi Jayaraman, 82, Indian violinist, cardiac arrest.
Carmel Kaine, 75, Australian violinist, co-founder/leader of Academy of St Martin in the Fields.
Bob Leakey, 98, British caver.
Clément Marchand, 100, Canadian poet and journalist.
Benjamin Milstein, 94, British surgeon and academic.
Lawrence Morley, 93, Canadian geophysicist.
Mike Smith, 77, English footballer (Bradford City).
Robert Suderburg, 77, American composer, conductor and pianist.
J. S. Verma, 80, Indian judge, Supreme Court (since 1989), Chief Justice (19971998), multiple organ failure.

23
Shirley Abbott, 88, American politician, US Ambassador to Lesotho (1983–1989), member of the Texas House of Representatives (1977–1979), cardiac complications.
Shamshad Begum, 94, Indian singer.
Norbert Blei, 77, American author and writer.
Walter Boeykens, 75, Belgian clarinetist and conductor.
Bob Brozman, 59, American guitarist and ethnomusicologist, suicide.
*José de Jesús Castillo Rentería, 85, Mexican Roman Catholic prelate, Bishop of Tuxtepec (1979–2005).
Philip L. Clarke, 74, American voice actor (Transformers, Alvin and the Chipmunks, The Little Mermaid).
Colonial Affair, 23, American thoroughbred, winner of Belmont Stakes (1993).
Kathryn Wasserman Davis, 106, American philanthropist.
Marv Diemer, 88, American politician, member of the Iowa House of Representatives (1978–1992).
Robert W. Edgar, 69, American politician and executive (Common Cause), U.S. Representative from Pennsylvania (1975–1987), heart attack.
Tony Grealish, 56, Irish footballer (Ireland, Brighton), cancer.
Ralph Johnson, 91, English footballer (Norwich City).
Norman Jones, 78, British television actor (Doctor Who, Crossroads).
Antonio Maccanico, 88, Italian politician, Minister of Posts and Communications (1996–1998), Minister of Institutional Reform (2000–2001).
Jim Mackonochie, 52, British Royal Navy officer and video game developer, liver cancer.
Jim Mortimer, 91, British trade unionist, General Secretary of the Labour Party (1982–1985).
Joseph R. Nolan, 87, American judge, member of the Massachusetts Supreme Judicial Court (1981–1995).
Frank W. J. Olver, 88, British–born American mathematician.
Mohammed Omar, c. 53, Afghan Taliban leader, tuberculosis.
John Somers Payne, 87, Irish Olympic sailor (1956, 1960).
Jose Solis, 73, Filipino politician, member of the House of Representatives for Sorsogon 2nd District (2001–2010).
Arnold Wolf, 85, American businessman.

24
Clara Berenbau, 32, Uruguayan actress and writer, cancer.
Alfred Bieler, 90, Swiss Olympic ice hockey player (1948).
Teodoro Buontempo, 67, Italian politician.
Richard Everett Dorr, 69, American judge, US District Court for Western Missouri (since 2002), cancer.
Larry Felser, 80, American sports journalist and columnist (Sporting News, The Buffalo News).
Dave Kocourek, 75, American football player (San Diego Chargers, Oakland Raiders), dementia.
Azuma Konno, 65, Japanese politician.
Gary L. Lancaster, 63, American chief judge, member of US District Court for Western Pennsylvania (since 1993), natural causes.
 José Meneses, 89, Mexican Olympic basketball player.
D. K. Adikesavulu Naidu, 72, Indian politician, MP for Chittoor (20042009), complications of cardiac surgery.
Ni Zhifu, 79, Chinese inventor and politician.
 Zlatomir Obradov, 72, Croatian footballer.
Saleem Pervez, 65, Pakistani cricketer, injuries sustained in traffic collision.
Pedro Romualdo, 77, Filipino politician, member of House of Representatives for Camiguin (19871998, since 2007), Governor of Camiguin (19982007), pneumonia.
Pierre Sadek, 75, Lebanese caricaturist.
Frank Salvat, 78, British Olympic runner (1960).
Murray Satterfield, 87, American college basketball coach (Boise State, College of Idaho).
Storm Cat, 30, American thoroughbred stallion, euthanized due to cancer.

25
Brian Adam, 64, Scottish politician, MSP for North East Scotland (1999–2003), Aberdeen North (2003–2011) and Aberdeen Donside (since 2011), cancer.
Jacob Avshalomov, 94, Chinese-born American conductor and composer.
Ambica Banerjee, 84, Indian politician, MP for Howrah (since 2006), West Bengal MLA for Howrah Central (19822005).
György Berencsi, 72, Hungarian virologist. 
Sean Caffrey, 73, Irish actor (Doctor Who, Z-Cars, Coronation Street).
Rick Camp, 59, American baseball player (Atlanta Braves), natural causes.
Stanley Dashew, 96, American businessman.
Virginia Gibson, 88, American actress (Seven Brides for Seven Brothers, Tea for Two).
Moses Harrison, 81, American judge, member of the Supreme Court of Illinois (19922002), Chief Justice (20002002).
Johnny Lockwood, 92, Australian actor (Number 96).
Anna Proclemer, 89, Italian actress (A Matter of Time, Journey to Italy).
Eion Scarrow, 81, New Zealand gardening television presenter and author.
Calvin Sutker, 89, American politician, member of the Illinois House of Representatives (19851991).
Yoshio Tabata, 94, Japanese ryūkōka and enka singer, songwriter and electric guitarist, pneumonia.
Sam Williams, 82, American football player (Detroit Lions), heart failure.
W. B. Young, 96, Scottish rugby union player.
Kees Zijlstra, 82, Dutch politician.

26
Romualdas Ignas Bloškys, 77, Lithuanian politician.
Jacqueline Brookes, 82, American actress (The Good Son, The Naked Gun 2½: The Smell of Fear) and acting teacher, lymphoma.
Rüdiger Butte, 63, German politician, shot.
Joseph Churchward, 80, Samoan–born New Zealand typeface designer, bowel cancer.
Mireya Cueto, 91, Mexican puppeteer.
Isaiah Dixon, 90, American politician, member of the Maryland House of Delegates (19661982), heart failure.
William L. Guy, 93, American politician, Governor of North Dakota (19611973), Alzheimer's disease.
Kenneth Hunter, 73, Scottish consultant physician.
George Jones, 81, American country music singer ("He Stopped Loving Her Today", "The Race Is On"), hypoxic respiratory failure.
Dave Kleiman, 46, American computer security detective.
Tom Knapp, 62, American sharpshooter, pulmonary fibrosis.
Lillian Leach, 76, American singer, lung cancer.
Al Loehr, 85, American Democratic politician.
Owen Lynch, 82, American anthropologist.
Sir Guy Millard, 96, British diplomat.
Len Rempt-Halmmans de Jongh, 85, Dutch politician.
Marion Rushing, 76, American football player (St. Louis Cardinals, Atlanta Falcons, Houston Oilers), Parkinson's disease.
Edward Szklarczyk, 71, Polish Olympic athlete.
Farrell Temata, 68, New Zealand rugby union player (Waikato) and coach, heart attack.
Mary Thom, 68, American magazine executive editor (Ms.), traffic collision.
Jim Tucker, 78, American investigative journalist, complications from fall.
Tui Uru, 87, New Zealand opera singer and broadcaster.
Earl Silverman, 64, Canadian domestic abuse survivor and Men's rights advocate.

27
Aída Bortnik, 75, Argentine screenwriter (The Official Story).
Tony Byrne, 82, Irish Olympic medalist boxer (1956).
Lorraine Copeland, 92, British archaeologist and Special Operations Executive agent. 
Dhoodaan, 72, Ethiopian Somali language writer. (death announced on this date)
Antonio Díaz, 43, Spanish footballer (Villarreal, Salamanca, Getafe).
Paulino Ferrer, 86, Venezuelan Olympic hurdler.
Albert Feuerwerker, 86, American historian.
Trudi Gerster, 93, fairy tale narrator and politician.
Maurice Gransart, 82, French footballer (Olympique de Marseille).
Jack Harker, 86, American computer scientist and businessman.
Sean Hartter, 39, American illustrator, writer and musician, asthma attack.
Jérôme Louis Heldring, 95, Dutch journalist and columnist.
*Aloysius Jin Luxian, 96, Chinese Roman Catholic prelate, Bishop of Shanghai (since 1988).
Mutula Kilonzo, 65, Kenyan politician, Senator (since 2010), MP for Mbooni (20082010) and senior counsel.
Jean Lessard, 80,  Canadian alpine skier.
Joseph Mwanyungwa, 46, Malawian judge, pneumonia.
Walter Nalangu, Solomon Islands news presenter and journalist, asthma attack.
Joseph O'Connell, 81, Australian Roman Catholic prelate, Auxiliary Bishop of Melbourne (1976–2006).
Arthur Joseph O'Neill, 95, American Roman Catholic prelate, Bishop of Rockford (19681994).
Norman Routledge, 85, British mathematician and schoolteacher.
Eeva Ruoppa, 80, Finnish Olympic bronze medallist cross-country skier (1960).
Jürgen Warnke, 81, German politician.
Theodore J. Williams, 89, American computer scientist.

28
Ron Baggott, 96, Australian football player (Melbourne).
Richard Barry, 93, Irish politician, TD for Cork East (1953–1981).
Alf Bellis, 92, English footballer.
Barry Fey, 75, American concert promoter (Red Rocks Amphitheatre, Colorado Symphony Orchestra).
Norris Hundley, 77, American academic, historian, and writer.
Jalsan, 66, Chinese politician and Buddhist leader. 
Brad Lesley, 54, American baseball player and actor (Little Big League), heart attack.
Fredrick McKissack, 73, American children's book writer.
Julio Ojeda Pascual, 81, Spanish-born Peruvian Roman Catholic prelate, Vicar Apostolic of San Ramón (1987–2003).
Araber Rahaman, 82, Indian politician, Tripura MLA for Boxanagar (19781988).
Sripathi Rajeshwar Rao, 73, Indian politician, Andhra Pradesh MLA for Sanathnagar (19851989, 19992003), kidney failure.
John C. Reynolds, 77, American computer scientist, heart attack.
Sailendra Nath Roy, 48, Indian stuntman, heart attack.
Carl M. Rynning-Tønnesen, 88, Norwegian police chief.
Viola B. Sanders, 92, American naval officer.
Jack Shea, 84, American director (The Jeffersons, Silver Spoons), President of the DGA (19972002), Alzheimer's disease.
János Starker, 88, Hungarian-born American cellist.
Paulo Vanzolini, 89, Brazilian zoologist, poet and samba composer (Onze sambas e uma capoeira), complications of pneumonia.
Bernie Wood, 70, New Zealand sport author and journalist, cancer.

29
Harry Blaney, 85, Irish politician, TD for Donegal North-East (1997–2002).
Pierre Chassang, 95, French aikidoka.
Alex Elisala, 20, New Zealand rugby league player (North Queensland Cowboys), suicide.
Pablo Gabriel Etchegoin, 48, Argentine-New Zealand physicist, pancreatic cancer.
Denton Fox, 65, American football player, stroke.
Pietro Garlato, 85, Italian Roman Catholic prelate, Bishop of Palestrina (1986–1991) and Tivoli (1991–2003).
Pesah Grupper, 88, Israeli politician, Minister of Agriculture (1983–1984).
Suhaimi Hassan, 59, Malaysian politician, heart attack.
Parekura Horomia, 62, New Zealand politician, MP for Ikaroa-Rāwhiti (since 1999), Minister of Māori Affairs (2000–2008).
Channa Horwitz, 80, American geometric artist, complications of Crohn's disease.
Shahid Israr, 63, Pakistani cricketer (Karachi, Sindh, national team).
Mike McMahon, Jr., 71, Canadian ice hockey player (New York Rangers).
John La Montaine, 93, American composer, Pulitzer Prize (1959).
Erling Løseth, 85, Norwegian politician. 
Shinji Maki, 78, Japanese comedian, suspected suicide by jumping. 
Ernest Michael, 87, American mathematician.
Kevin Moore, 55, English footballer (Grimsby Town, Southampton), Pick's disease.
Ole K. Sara, 76, Norwegian politician. 
Basudeo Singh, 80, Indian politician, Bihar MLA for Begusarai (1990–1995).
Patrick Taval, 56, Papua New Guinean Roman Catholic prelate, Bishop of Kerema (since 2010).
Marianna Zachariadi, 23, Greek-born Cypriot pole vaulter, Commonwealth Games silver medalist (2010), Hodgkin's lymphoma.

30
Don Bowman, 76, Australian politician, member of the New South Wales Legislative Assembly for Swansea (1981–1988, 1991–1995).
Tito Buss, 87, Brazilian Roman Catholic prelate, Bishop of Rio do Sul (1969–2000).
Roberto Chabet, 76, Filipino artist, heart attack.
Jolico Cuadra, 73, Filipino poet and artist.
Shirley Firth, 59, Canadian Gwich'in Olympic skier (1972, 1976, 1980, 1984).
Viviane Forrester, 87, French writer, essayist, novelist and literary critic.
Emil Frei, 89, American cancer researcher.
Irineos Galanakis, 101, Greek Orthodox prelate, Bishop of Kissamos (19571971), Metropolitan of Germany (19711980), Metropolitan of Kissamos (19822005).
Mike Gray, 77, American screenwriter (The China Syndrome, Star Trek: The Next Generation) and author, heart failure.
Lois Jotter, 99, American botanist.
Andrew J. Offutt, 78, American science fiction author, cirrhosis.
Sándor Rácz, 80, Hungarian politician, veteran of the Hungarian Revolution of 1956.
Fakir Vaghela, 60, Indian politician.

References

2013-04
 04